The following is a sortable table of all songs by Neck Deep:

Studio recordings

See also
 Neck Deep discography

References
 Footnotes
Originally available for free download from the band's Facebook page.
Bonus track on the HMV and Target editions of Life's Not out to Get You (2015).

 Citations

Neck Deep